Morente is a Spanish surname. Notable people with the surname include:

Enrique Morente (1942–2010), Spanish singer
Estrella Morente (born 1980), Spanish singer, daughter of Enrique
Tete Morente (born 1996), Spanish footballer

See also
Lorente

Spanish-language surnames